is a retired Japanese male breaststroke swimmer. He represented Japan at the 1996 Summer Olympics in Atlanta, Georgia.

References
 Profile

1978 births
Living people
Japanese male breaststroke swimmers
Olympic swimmers of Japan
Swimmers at the 1996 Summer Olympics
Sportspeople from Fukuoka Prefecture
Asian Games medalists in swimming
Asian Games bronze medalists for Japan
Swimmers at the 1998 Asian Games
Medalists at the 1998 Asian Games
20th-century Japanese people